Burmanopetalum is an extinct genus of millipede containing the single species Burmanopetalum inexpectatum from the Cretaceous of Myanmar. It is a member of the order Callipodida and is the only member of the suborder Burmanopetalidea and family Burmanopetalidae.

Description 
The holotype adult female specimen is just over 8 millimetres long, which is extremely small for the order, it is distinguished by the presence of 35 cylindrical body rings with free sternites and fused tergites, among other characters.

Discovery 
The specimen was discovered in Burmese amber, a productive amber deposit in Kachin State, which has been dated to earliest Cenomanian, or approximately 99 million years old. As of the time of publication, it is the only known callipodid in the Burmese amber out of 529 known millipede specimens, most of which belong to extant families and even genera.

References 

Burmese amber
Callipodida
Cretaceous animals of Asia